"Viva, Viva a FRELIMO" was the national anthem of Mozambique from independence from Portugal on 25 June 1975 to 30 April 2002, when it was replaced by "Pátria Amada".

History
The anthem was written by Justino Sigaulane Chemane in 1975 and adopted as the national anthem of the People's Republic of Mozambique on 25 June 1975. The lyrics celebrate Mozambique's independence, socialism and Mozambique's main political party, FRELIMO, which brought the country to its independence in 1975.

In 1994, multi-party elections were held in Mozambique, and consequently the lyrics to the anthem were often omitted from most public performances and radio broadcasts, as they were felt to be inappropriate in a multi-party, capitalist country. In April 1997, the government initiated a national contest to see who could write the best new lyrics for the national anthem. Initially, this contest sought to change the lyrics and keep the melody, however eventually the requirement for the melody was dropped. "Pátria Amada" became Mozambique's national anthem on 30 April 2002, after a majority vote by the Assembly of the Republic.

Lyrics

See also

List of national anthems

Notes

References

External links

People’s Republic of Mozambique: Viva, Viva a FRELIMO - Audio of the national anthem of the People’s Republic of Mozambique, with information and lyrics
Instrumental version of Viva, Viva a FRELIMO on YouTube

African anthems
FRELIMO
Historical national anthems
History of Mozambique
National symbols of Mozambique
Mozambican music